Cytorhabdovirus is a genus of viruses in the family Rhabdoviridae, order Mononegavirales. Plants serve as natural hosts.

Structure
Cytorhabdovirions are enveloped, with bullet shaped and  bacilliform geometries. These virions are about 75 nm wide and 180 nm long.

Genome
Cytorhabdovirus genomes are linear and around 13 kb in length.

Life cycle
Viral replication is cytoplasmic. Entry into the host cell is achieved by attachment of the viral G glycoproteins to host receptors, which mediates endocytosis. Replication follows the negative stranded RNA virus replication model. Negative stranded RNA virus transcription, using polymerase stuttering is the method of transcription. The virus exits the host cell by budding, and  tubule-guided viral movement. Plants serve as the natural host. The virus is transmitted via a vector (insect aphid, leafhopper, planthopper, and insect). Transmission routes are vectors.

Taxonomy 

The following species are recognized:

 Alfalfa dwarf cytorhabdovirus
 Barley yellow striate mosaic cytorhabdovirus
 Broccoli necrotic yellows cytorhabdovirus
 Cabbage cytorhabdovirus
 Colocasia bobone disease-associated cytorhabdovirus
 Festuca leaf streak cytorhabdovirus
 Lettuce necrotic yellows cytorhabdovirus
 Lettuce yellow mottle cytorhabdovirus
 Maize yellow striate cytorhabdovirus
 Maize-associated cytorhabdovirus
 Northern cereal mosaic cytorhabdovirus
 Papaya cytorhabdovirus
 Persimmon cytorhabdovirus
 Raspberry vein chlorosis cytorhabdovirus
 Rice stripe mosaic cytorhabdovirus
 Sonchus cytorhabdovirus 1
 Strawberry crinkle cytorhabdovirus
 Strawberry cytorhabdovirus 1
 Tomato yellow mottle-associated cytorhabdovirus
 Trichosanthes cytorhabdovirus
 Trifolium pratense cytorhabdovirus A
 Trifolium pratense cytorhabdovirus B
 Wheat American striate mosaic cytorhabdovirus
 Wuhan 4 insect cytorhabdovirus
 Wuhan 5 insect cytorhabdovirus
 Wuhan 6 insect cytorhabdovirus
 Yerba mate chlorosis-associated cytorhabdovirus
 Yerba mate cytorhabdovirus

References

External links
 Viralzone: Cytorhabdovirus
 ICTV Online Report Rhabdoviridae

Rhabdoviridae
Virus genera